Nicholas Krall is an American baseball executive. He is the general manager of the Cincinnati Reds of Major League Baseball.

Krall is from York, Pennsylvania. He attended York Catholic High School, graduating in 1995, and Louisiana State University (LSU), where he attempted unsuccessfully to walk on to the LSU Tigers baseball team in 1999. After graduating, he worked in an internship for the New Jersey Cardinals of the New York-Penn League, and then joined the Oakland Athletics in 2001, working in the baseball operations department. He joined the Reds in 2003 as an advance scout. He became Assistant Director of Baseball Operations in 2008, and was promoted to Senior Director of Baseball Operations in 2014 and to Assistant General Manager in 2015. Krall was promoted to General Manager on May 10, 2018.

References

Living people
Cincinnati Reds executives
Oakland Athletics executives
Louisiana State University alumni
Major League Baseball general managers
1970s births
Sportspeople from York, Pennsylvania